The 1990 NCAA Women's Gymnastics championship involved 12 schools competing for the national championship of women's NCAA Division I gymnastics.  It was the ninth NCAA gymnastics national championship and the defending NCAA Team Champion for 1989 was Georgia.  The competition took place in Corvallis, Oregon hosted by the Oregon State University in Gill Coliseum. The 1990 Championship was won by Utah.

Team Results

External links
  Gym Results

NCAA Women's Gymnastics championship
NCAA Women's Gymnastics Championship